Pembroke Borough A.F.C. are a Welsh football club from the town of Pembroke, Pembrokeshire in the southwest of Wales. They are twice champions of the Welsh Football League's top division. The club currently play in the Pembrokeshire League Division Three.

History
The team was formed as a successor to Pembroke Dock Athletic Club.

Honours

 Welsh Football League Division One - Champions (2): 1953–54; 1955–56
 Welsh Football League Division One - Runners-Up (4): 1952–53; 1956–57; 1968–69; 1973–74
 Welsh Football League Division Two West - Champions: 1947–48
 Welsh Football League Division Two West - Runners-Up: 1946–47
 Welsh Football League Cup - Winners (4): 1953–54; 1958–59; 1985–86; 1992–93
 Welsh Football League Cup - Runners-Up (3): 1961–62; 1990–91; 1991–92
 Pembrokeshire League Division One - Champions (2):  1948–49; 1964–65
 Pembrokeshire League Division Two - Runners-up: 1991–92
 Pembrokeshire League Division Three - Champions: 1988–89; 2000–01
 Pembrokeshire League Division Three - Runners-up: 1973–74; 1995–96
 Pembrokeshire Senior Cup – Winners (1): 1948-49
 Pembrokeshire Senior Cup – Runners-Up (2): 1957-58; 1967–68 
 West Wales FA Senior Cup – Winners (4): 1971-72; 1972–73; 1977–78; 1980-81
 West Wales FA Senior Cup - Runners-Up (2): 1987-88; 1988–89

Welsh Football League history

Notes

See also
Category: Pembroke Borough AFC players

References

External links
Club history from FCHD

Football clubs in Wales
Sport in Pembrokeshire
Pembrokeshire League clubs
Welsh Football League clubs